Anneli Maley (born 1 September 1998) is an Australian professional basketball player for the Bendigo Spirit of the Women's National Basketball League.  She also played for the Chicago Sky of the WNBA in 2022.

Career

WNBL
Maley began her WNBL career in South Australia, signed mid-season with the Adelaide Lightning for the 2016–17 WNBL season.

In August 2019, Maley signed with the newly rebranded Southside Flyers for the 2019–20 season.

In June 2020, Maley signed on for her third season in the WNBL after signing with the Sydney Uni Flames.

College
Maley was signed by the University of Oregon and played for the Ducks in NCAA Division I in the 2017–18 season. After that season, she transferred to Texas Christian University (TCU); due to NCAA rules, she was initially ineligible to play in the 2018–19 season. TCU applied for and received a waiver of said NCAA rule, allowing Maley to play for the Horned Frogs in that season. However, she made only sporadic starts in the early part of the season, and left TCU during that season's Christmas break.

WNBA career statistics

Regular season

|-
| align="left" | 2022
| align="left" | Chicago
| 4 || 0 || 11.0 || .500 || .667 || .000 || 1.8|| 0.8 || 0.8|| 0.3|| 0.3 || 2.0
|-
| align="left" | Career
| align="left" | 1 year, 1 team
| 4 || 0 || 11.0 || .500 || .667 || .000 || 1.8|| 0.8 || 0.8|| 0.3|| 0.3 || 2.0

National team
Maley first played for Australia at the 2013 FIBA Oceania Under-16 Championship where she took home Gold. She would then go on to participate in the world championship in the Czech Republic where Australia placed 5th. Maley would then go on to play for the Gems at the 2014 FIBA Oceania Under-18 Championship. After winning Gold there, the Gems then won Bronze the following year at the 2015 FIBA Under-19 World Championship in Russia.

Personal life
Maley's father, Paul Maley, played in the NBL for the North Melbourne Giants and Adelaide 36ers.

References

Forwards (basketball)
Australian expatriate basketball people in the United States
Australian women's basketball players
1998 births
Living people
Chicago Sky players
Adelaide Lightning players
Oregon Ducks women's basketball players
TCU Horned Frogs women's basketball players
Basketball players from Melbourne
LGBT basketball players
Australian LGBT sportspeople
Lesbian sportswomen
Universiade gold medalists for Australia
Universiade medalists in basketball
Medalists at the 2019 Summer Universiade
People from East Melbourne
Sportswomen from Victoria (Australia)